Louis Giani (August 18, 1934 – January 19, 2021) was an American wrestler. He competed in the men's freestyle featherweight at the 1960 Summer Olympics. For 38 years, he was the head wrestling coach at Huntingtown High School in Huntington, New York, compiling a career record of 416–32. He is a member of the National Wrestling Hall of Fame.

References

External links
 

1934 births
2021 deaths
American male sport wrestlers
Olympic wrestlers of the United States
Wrestlers at the 1960 Summer Olympics
Sportspeople from New York City
American wrestling coaches
Pan American Games medalists in wrestling
Pan American Games gold medalists for the United States
Wrestlers at the 1959 Pan American Games
20th-century American people
21st-century American people